Şapköy can refer to:

 Şapköy, Ayvacık
 Şapköy, Ezine